Diana Raab is an American author, poet, lecturer, educator and inspirational speaker.

Early life
Raab was born in Brooklyn, New York of two immigrant parents. She received her B.S. from Cortland State University in Health Administration with a minor in Journalism. She received her R.N. degree from Vanier College in Quebec, Canada and took her licensure in French. In 2003, she earned her MFA in Writing from Spalding University's low residency program in Kentucky. Raab was a medical journalist for 25 years. She has a Ph.D. in Psychology with a concentration in Transpersonal Psychology from Sofia University (Formerly The Institute of Transpersonal Psychology) in Palo Alto. Her research  involved the transformative and healing aspects of memoir writing.

Career
Raab received her Ph.D. in Psychology with a concentration in Transpersonal Psychology. Her dissertation/thesis abstract, Creative transcendence: Memoir writing for transformation and empowerment. This narrative inquiry examined the transformative and empowering dynamics of writing a memoir in connection with transcendent and pivotal experiences, particularly the experience of a certain loss, and the relationship between Maslow's theory of metamotivation (of self-actualized individuals) B-(being) creativity and D-(deficiency) creativity, and the writing of a memoir.

Raab lectures and facilitates workshops in memoir, poetry, and writing for healing and transformation.

She is a regular contributor to Psychology Today, Thrive Global., PsychCentral, and Wisdom Daily.

Her work has appeared in journals and anthologies includingThe Writer, Yoga Journal, Mind Body Green, Well Being Journal, Rattle, Black Fox Literary Review, New York Spirit, The Washington Post,

Selected works
 Raab, Diana. Writing for Bliss: A Companion Journal. Loving Healing Press. (2019). ( paperback)
Raab, Diana. Writing for Bliss: A Seven-Step Plan for Telling Your Story and Transforming Your Life. Loving Healing Press. (2017).
 Raab, Diana. Lust: Poems WordTech Communications (2014).
 Raab, Diana. Listening to Africa: Poems. Antrim House Books (2012).
 Raab, Diana. Writers on the Edge: 22 Writers Speak About Addiction and Dependency., co-editor. Foreword by Jerry Stahl. Modern History Press. 2012.
 Raab, Diana. Healing With Words: A Writer's Cancer Journey. Loving Healing Press (2011).
 Raab, Diana. Writers and Their Notebooks, Editor. Foreword by Phillip Lopate. The University of South Carolina Press (2010). ( softcover;  hardcover)
 Raab, Diana. Your High Risk Pregnancy: A Practical and Supportive Guide. Hunter House. (2009).
 Raab, Diana. The Guilt Gene: Poems. Plain View Press (2008).
 Raab, Diana. Getting Pregnant and Staying Pregnant: Overcoming Infertility and Managing Your High Risk Pregnancy. Hunter House (1991, 1999, 2009).
 Raab, Diana. My Muse Undresses Me. Pudding House Publications (2007).
 Raab, Diana. Regina's Closet: Finding My Grandmother's Secret Journal. Beaufort Books (2007).
 Raab, Diana. Dear Anais: My Life in Poems for You. Plain View Press (2008).

References

External links
 Official website

1954 births
Living people
Spalding University alumni
American women poets
21st-century American poets
21st-century American women writers